Coronocephalus is an extinct genus of trilobites in the Phacopid family Encrinuridae. Species are from the Silurian of Australia and Japan, and from the Silurian and Ordovician of China.

See also 
 List of trilobite genera

References

External links 

 
 
Coronocephalus at insectoid.info

Silurian trilobites
Encrinuridae genera